Shaquille Alphonso McDonald (born 19 July 1995) is an English footballer who plays for  side Mickleover, where he plays as a forward.

Playing career

Early career
Born in Birmingham, West Midlands, McDonald was with Birmingham City's youth system from 2011 to 2012. He joined Chasetown's scholarship scheme in July 2012, before joining Championship club Peterborough United five months later after impressing on trial.

Peterborough United
McDonald signed a four-year professional contract with Peterborough United on 5 April 2013. On 13 September 2013, McDonald joined Conference Premier club Chester on loan until January 2014. On his debut a day later, he was sent off for violent conduct in a 3–1 away defeat to Salisbury City. It would be the only appearance he made for the club. He returned to Peterborough before being loaned out to Conference North club Histon on 18 October 2013. He was released by Peterborough on 15 November 2013 by mutual consent.

York City
Having been on trial with League Two club York City in December 2013, McDonald joined on 1 January 2014. He was released at the end of the 2013–14 season without playing.

Derby County
McDonald signed for Championship club Derby County on 1 August 2014 on a two-year contract after a successful trial. On 26 March 2015, he joined Cheltenham Town on loan, making his debut two days later in a 3–0 home defeat to Plymouth Argyle.

on 27 November 2015, McDonald joined National League club FC Halifax Town on a youth loan until 2 January 2016. He made his debut on 15 December 2015 in a 5–0 home win over Tamworth in the FA Trophy, scoring from the rebound after Nicky Wroe's shot was blocked. He scored 4 goals from 19 appearances for FC Halifax, and was on the bench as they beat Grimsby Town at Wembley Stadium in the 2016 FA Trophy Final. He was released by Derby at the end of 2015–16.

Nuneaton Town
McDonald signed for National League North club Nuneaton Town on 11 June 2016 on a one-year contract. McDonald left the club during the January transfer window He made 12 appearances and scored one goal.

Black Country Rangers
McDonald signed for West Midlands (Regional) League team Black Country Rangers in August 2017. Shaquille proved a very capable player at that the level, making 17 appearances and scoring 24 goals.

Coventry United
McDonald signed for Midlands Football League side Coventry United in December 2017 for the second half of the 2017/18 season . That year he scored 16 goals in 14 games for the Midlands club.

Mickleover Sports
In December 2018, McDonald signed for Northern Premier League club Mickleover Sports. McDonald ended the season as top scorer for the club and saved the club from relegation in the final 15 minutes of the game by scoring one and assisting the other to keep them in the division.

Bromsgrove Sporting
On 11 June 2019 McDonald signed for Southern League Premier Division Central side Bromsgrove Sporting. He made his debut on the opening day of the Southern League Premier Division season on 10 August 2019, as Bromsgrove Sporting drew 1-1 at home to Biggleswade Town. Shaquille scored his first goal for Bromsgrove Sporting in the following game, scoring the 2nd goal, as Bromsgrove Sporting came from behind to beat Tamworth 3-1 away from home on 13 August 2019.

McDonald was prolific for Bromsgrove Sporting throughout the 2019-20 season, scoring a brace at home to Barwell in a FA Trophy fixture on 29 October 2019, however were defeated 7-2, and crashed out of the competition. He also bagged a brace in a Southern League Premier Division fixture away at Needham Market on the 14 December 2019, which Bromsgrove Sporting won 3-0. Shaquille scored a hat-trick on 8 February 2020 in a 6-0 demolition at home to Lowestoft Town in the Southern League Premier Division.

McDonald finished the season with a very impressive goalscoring record in the Southern League Premier Division, finishing with a ratio of a goal in every two matches. In total he made 26 appearances and scoring 13 goals, coupled with six appearances, scoring five goals in the cup competitions. McDonald confirmed via social media on 27 June 2020, that he would be leaving the club following the expiry of his contract.

Tamworth
McDonald was confirmed as joining fellow Southern League Premier Division Central side Tamworth on 1 July 2020. McDonald made his debut for Tamworth on 19 September 2020 in a 1–1 away draw at Peterborough Sports on the opening day of the season.

Shaquille committed to Tamworth for a second season on 31 May 2021. He played the clubs first game of the 2021–22 season on the 14 August 2021 away at Royston Town. McDonald was replaced on the 57th minute by Dexter Walters following an injury.

McDonald returned to first team action on 23 October 2021, in a Southern League Premier Division Central home fixture against Leiston. Shaquille began the match as a substitute, but with Tamworth tailing 2-0 at half time, he was introduced for the 2nd half in place of Michael Tait, McDonald went on to score Tamworth's only goal in the game, which ended in a disappointing 3-1 defeat. McDonald played the whole of the following match on 26 October 2021, as Tamworth where held at home to a 0-0 draw against Hitchin Town in a Southern League Premier Division Central fixture.

Mickleover
On 17 January 2022, McDonald was announced as signing for Northern Premier League Premier Division club Mickleover.

Career statistics

Club

References

External links

1995 births
Living people
Footballers from Birmingham, West Midlands
English footballers
Association football forwards
English Football League players
National League (English football) players
Southern Football League players
Black British sportspeople
Birmingham City F.C. players
Chasetown F.C. players
Alsager Town F.C. players
Peterborough United F.C. players
Chester F.C. players
Histon F.C. players
York City F.C. players
Derby County F.C. players
Cheltenham Town F.C. players
FC Halifax Town players
Nuneaton Borough F.C. players
Coventry United F.C. players
Mickleover Sports F.C. players
Bromsgrove Sporting F.C. players
Tamworth F.C. players